Section 23 may refer to:

Section23 Films, an American multimedia distributor
Section 23 of the Canadian Charter of Rights and Freedoms
Section 23 of the Constitution of Australia

See also